The 2020 Il Lombardia was a one-day road cycling race that took place on 15 August 2020 in the Italian region of Lombardy. It was part of the 2020 UCI World Tour and was the 114th edition of Il Lombardia. The race was initially scheduled to take place on 10 October. The race was first rescheduled to 31 October with the May calendar update, and subsequently to 15 August with the June calendar update due to the COVID-19 pandemic.

On the descent of the Muro di Sormano, Belgian rider Remco Evenepoel of  crashed into a low wall on a bridge, somersaulting over it and into the ravine below. He suffered a fractured pelvis and a right lung contusion and had to abandon the race. On the final climb, the San Fermo della Battaglia, Bennett put in several attacks that managed to shed Vlasov, but Fuglsang put in the winning move moments later and in turn dropped Bennett. Fuglsang soloed to victory and, in doing so, became the first Danish winner of the race. As a result of the crash, Schachmann fractured his collarbone.

Teams
Twenty-five teams, consisting of all 19 UCI WorldTeams and 6 UCI ProTeams, participated in the race. Of the 174 riders that started the race, 86 finished, while a further 18 riders finished over the time limit.

UCI WorldTeams

 
 
 
 
 
 
 
 
 
 
 
 
 
 
 
 
 
 

UCI Professional Continental teams

Results

References

Sources

 

Il Lombardia
Il Lombardia
Il Lombardia
Giro di Lombardia